is a train station on the Nankō Port Town Line (New Tram) in Suminoe-ku, Osaka, Japan.

Lines
 (Station Number: P11)

Layout
There is an elevated island platform with two tracks. The station is completely walled in with glass walls.

References

Railway stations in Osaka Prefecture
Osaka Metro stations
Railway stations in Japan opened in 1981